Pirapitinga Ecological Station is an ecological station in Brazil, on an island in the lake formed by the Três Marias Dam in Minas Gerais.

Location

It was created on 20 July 1987.
It is managed by the Chico Mendes Institute for Biodiversity Conservation.
It is located in the municipality of Morada Nova de Minas in the state of Minas Gerais.
When the reservoir of the Três Marias Dam was filled in 1962 the station purchased the island that was formed when the reservoir was full.

Endemic fauna include curl-crested jay (Cyanocorax cristatellus), peach-fronted parakeet (Eupsittula aurea), shrike-like tanager (Neothraupis fasciata), white-eared puffbird (Nystalus chacuru) and red-bellied macaw (Orthopsittaca manilatus).

Conservation

The Ecological Station is a "strict nature reserve" under IUCN protected area category Ia.
It was created to protect the environment and support basic and applied ecological research and education in conservation.
The station is a habitat for the near threatened maned wolf and the giant anteater.

References

Sources

1987 establishments in Brazil
Ecological stations of Brazil
Protected areas of Minas Gerais
Protected areas established in 1987
Cerrado